Phesatiodes fuscosignatus is a species of beetle in the family Cerambycidae, and the only species in the genus Phesatiodes. It was described by Hüdepohl in 1995.

References

Pteropliini
Beetles described in 1995